Federica Dassù (born 17 February 1957) is an Italian professional golfer.

Career
Dassù was born in Milan. She turned professional in 1983 and joined the Women Professional Golfers' European Tour (now the Ladies European Tour). She won her last Ladies European Tour title, the 2003 Open de España Femenino at an age of 44, the oldest LET winner at the time, and announced her retirement at the end of the season. The following year Dassù caddied for Diana Luna as she won the Tenerife Ladies Open. In addition to her wins, she was runner-up at the 1995 Ladies European Masters and the 1999 Royal Marie-Claire Open.

Professional wins (6)

Ladies European Tour wins (6)
1984 White Horse Whisky Challenge
1985 Bowring Birmingham Ladies Classic
1991 Woolmark Ladies' Matchplay
1993 Ford Ladies Classic
1996 Compaq Open
2003 Open de España Femenino

Team appearances
Amateur
European Lady Junior's Team Championship (representing Italy): 1972 (winners), 1973, 1974, 1976 (winners), 1977
European Ladies' Team Championship (representing Italy): 1973, 1981
Espirito Santo Trophy (representing Italy): 1974, 1976, 1980, 1982
Vagliano Trophy (representing the Continent of Europe): 1973, 1981 (winners)

References

External links

Italian female golfers
Ladies European Tour golfers
Sportspeople from Milan
1957 births
Living people